Matthew Henry Vaniel (November 14, 1919 – January 1, 1981) was an American professional basketball player. He played in the National Basketball League for the Pittsburgh Raiders during the 1944–45 season. He averaged 7.5 points per game in 24 games. He was elected to the Pennsylvania Sports Hall of Fame shortly before his death.

References

1919 births
1981 deaths
American men's basketball players
Basketball players from Pennsylvania
Forwards (basketball)
Pittsburgh Raiders players
People from Braddock, Pennsylvania